Holly Elizabeth Ridings (born 25 December 1973) is an American mechanical engineer and the first woman to be chief flight director at NASA. She works at the Johnson Space Center.

Early life and education 
Ridings was born in Amarillo, Texas. She attended Texas A&M University, where she studied mechanical engineering and graduated in 1996. Ridings was made a member of the NASA Academy. She took part in a student program at the Goddard Space Flight Center.

She is married to her fellow NASA employee, Michael Baine.

Career 

Ridings joined NASA in 1998, working as an International Space Station flight controller in the Thermal Operations and Resources Group. She eventually became lead for the International Space Station Attitude Determination and Control group. In 2003 she became lead for the Space Station Motion Control Systems Group. 
In 2005 she was made a flight director. She was lead director for Expedition 16, STS-127 and SpaceX Dragon. As expedition 16 lead, Ridings was responsible for the crew of the International Space Station for STS-120, STS-122, STS-123 as well as the first Automated Transfer Vehicle mission. During STS-127, Ridings overlooked major construction to the International Space Station, including the addition of the Japanese Exposed Facility and the External Platform. Ridings was promoted to Deputy Chief Flight Director. She was responsible for the safety of the International Space Station crew during the SpaceX Dragon Demo.

In September 2018 Ridings was announced as the chief flight director at NASA. She is responsible for 32 flight directors who are overseeing human spaceflight. She will oversee missions to the International Space Station, the Orion spacecraft as well as integrating trips of commercial crew spacecraft.

Awards and honors
Ridings won the NASA Outstanding Leadership Medal for Expedition 16 and the SpaceX Dragon Mission.

References 

NASA flight controllers
American aerospace engineers
Mechanical engineers
Texas A&M University alumni
People from Amarillo, Texas
1973 births
Living people